Robert Marlow (born Robert Allen, 21 October 1961 – 22 September 2022) was an English synth-pop singer, songwriter and musician.

Biography
Robert Marlow grew up in Basildon with future Depeche Mode members Vince Clarke, Martin Gore and Andy Fletcher (who died the same year as Marlow, and at the same age). He was also tied to Alison Moyet, with whom he had played in a band, The Vandals. He knew Fletcher and Clarke from the Basildon chapter of the Boys' Brigade. He and Clarke would occasionally get together to play music. Clarke on guitar, and Marlow on the church's piano. Like Clarke, he played in many local bands, and ended up playing in a band, with Clarke, called The Plan, and later French Look, with Martin Gore and Paul Redmond.

After the release of "Calling All Destroyers", Marlow shifted between acting and bands.

Music

Robert Marlow solo and Film Noir
Marlow recorded the studio album The Peter Pan Effect with his best friend Vince Clarke in 1983, around the end of Yazoo. The project came around when Marlow was in a band called Film Noir, with future keyboardist and guitarist for the Cure, Perry Bamonte. This band supported Depeche Mode on one tour date in Basildon.

Some time after Clarke left Depeche Mode, Marlow approached Clarke and charmed him into some studio time at Blackwing Studios with him and Eric Radcliffe. He was offered only one day, and decided to record "The Face of Dorian Gray". This then led to more studio time, and then a complete single, with B-side and 12" mixes. It was then that Clarke suggested that he try to get record company interest. He ended up getting interest from RCA Records, but was later decided to be released on Clarke's short-lived Reset Records label. The single, however, did not get much radio airplay.

After that, he released three more singles: "I Just Want to Dance", "Claudette" and "Calling All Destroyers". These singles suffered the same fate as "The Face of Dorian Gray", and the album was later shelved due to the lack of chart success.

The Peter Pan Effect
The Peter Pan Effect was released in 1999 by Swedish label Energy Rekords, when Sonet manager, Rod Buckle, showed a demo tape to Energy Rekords. Eric Radcliffe then went up into the bell tower of Blackwing Studios, formerly a church, and found the tapes. He then sent a CD to Energy Records, where it was remastered at Polar Studios. In the US, it was released as Erasure's Vince Clarke along with a copy of a Family Fantastic album.

Marlow... Just Marlow
The one man project Robert Marlow then transformed into the duo Marlow with the help of Gary Durant. Durant, who played keyboards and provided backing vocals had been a friend of Robert Marlow for some time.

In early 2006, the guestbook on Marlow's Energy Records label, announced a new album, in the works. As of March 2008, they were finishing the album. The band has been active in live performances, though. They played at a Depeche Mode aftershow, in February 2006, and have been playing in gigs, around Europe; particularly London and Sweden. About that time, they recorded their first album "Inside Outside" with the title track arranged and produced by Vince Clarke, who had also remixed a track on the album called "Home". The album was released on 27 February 2009.

At the end of 2011 Marlow has a second album "The Future" ready to be released, at the latest in early 2012. In April 2012 the band's label placed an announcement that Marlow had decided to quit as a band. Marlow and Durant broke up the duo in good friendship. The release of the album "The Future" will be reviewed and might be available to the general public at a later date, maybe 2013.

Robert Marlow solo – once again
After the split of Marlow (the duo) in Spring 2012, Marlow once again performed as a solo artist. A new 7 track EP, The Blackwing Sessions on the German label *Electro-Shock-Records*, which contained tracks with other vocals and instrumentals from the 1982–1984 recordings in the Blackwing Studios, was released in a pre-sale session on 8 August 2012 exclusively via the German mailorder-shop POPoNAUT. The official release date of the limited edition (only 300 x CDs) was 19 September 2012.

After the break up of the duo, Marlow reworked the album The Future, with on there 6 tracks and a classic unreleased Vince Clarke remix, will be released in 2013. The remixed album version, The Future Remixes was released half a year later.

Death
Marlow died after a short and unexpected illness on 22 September 2022, at the age of 60.

Discography

Robert Marlow albums (solo)

Robert Marlow remix albums (solo)

Robert Marlow EP (solo)

Robert Marlow singles (solo)

MARLOW albums

MARLOW singles

1 earlier released EP now placed on Inside Outside album
2 videoclip only

References

Print references
 Miller, Jonathan, Stripped: The True Story of Depeche Mode, 2004, Omnibus Press, 

Online references
 Energy Rekords' Artist Page
 Interview for the official Erasure website

External links
 
 

1961 births
2022 deaths
20th-century English musicians
21st-century English musicians
British synth-pop new wave musicians
English electronic musicians
English pop singers
English new wave musicians
English male singer-songwriters
People from Basildon
Musicians from Essex
Male new wave singers